Vitis menghaiensis is a species of climbing vine in the grape family native to China. It is found in mixed forests around 1500–1600 meters above sea-level. It flowers in May, and male flowers have non-functioning ovaries.

In Chinese it is known as meng hai pu tao, or Menghai grape. It is named for Menghai [courageous sea] county in Yunnan. This is also the derivation for the epithet menghaiensis. In Chinese pu tao means "grape".

References

menghaiensis
Plants described in 1996
Flora of China